Poltava-South (Poltava-Pivd) is a railway station in Ukraine city Poltava.

See also
Ukrzaliznytsia - the national railway company of Ukraine
Poltava Kyivska Railway station - is a railway station in Poltava

References

External links
 Poltava-South station on Ukrzaliznytsia site (Ukrainian)
 Timetable of the station Poltava-Pivd (Ukraine)

Southern Railways (Ukraine) stations
Railway stations in Poltava
Railway stations in Poltava Oblast
Railway stations opened in 1870